Plant ontology (PO) is a collection of ontologies developed by the Plant Ontology Consortium.  These ontologies describe anatomical structures and growth and developmental stages across Viridiplantae. The PO is intended for multiple applications, including genetics, genomics, phenomics, and development, taxonomy and systematics, semantic applications and education.

Project Members
Oregon State University
New York Botanical Garden
L. H. Bailey Hortorium at Cornell University
Ensembl
SoyBase
SSWAP
SGN
Gramene
The Arabidopsis Information Resource (TAIR)
MaizeGDB
University of Missouri at St. Louis
Missouri Botanical Garden

See also
Generic Model Organism Database
Open Biomedical Ontologies
OBO Foundry

References

External links
Plant Ontology Consortium
Gramene
TAIR
MaizeGDB
NASC
SoyBase

Ontology
Biological databases